Jailhouse Blues (1929) is a short musical film released by Columbia Pictures. It features Mamie Smith, who was a top star in Black Vaudeville and a recording artist with Okeh Records. By the time Jailhouse Blues was made her contract with Okeh had ended. Basil Smith directed. The film and its soundtrack have been rediscovered.

Synopsis
Mamie is missing her man, and finds him in jail.  She pleads through her singing for his release.

Cast
Mamie Smith
Homer Tutt
 Porter Grainger
 Billy Mitchell 
Andrew Fairchild

Related history and preservation status
Two songs were prerecorded by Victor Records, "Jailhouse Blues" and "You Can't Do It!" as for the film's soundtrack.

The visual element has been held at the Library of Congress for a long time, but no soundtrack disc was known. At one point a disc was located, but was destroyed accidentally in shipping. An intact disc was discovered in Australia in 2009 and, as of this writing (March 2011) the short is slated for preservation. Two short clips from Jailhouse Blues were shown on a 1961 DuPont Show of the Week broadcast, and this has served as the source of the widely circulated clips and audio from the film since.

References

External links
 

1929 films
1929 musical films
African-American musical films
American musical films
Columbia Pictures films
Lost American films
American black-and-white films
1920s English-language films
1920s American films